Bayit VeGan (lit. House and Garden) is a neighborhood in southwest Jerusalem. Bayit VeGan is located to the east of Mount Herzl and borders the neighborhoods of Kiryat HaYovel and Givat Mordechai.

History

Bronze Age
A 4,000-year-old cemetery and many Canaanite artifacts were discovered in an archeological dig at the edge of Bayit Vagan.  The cemetery covers an area of more than half an acre (0.2 hectare), and burials are believed to have taken place there mainly in the Bronze Age, in 2200-2000 BCE and 1700-1600 BCE. Excavations began in 1995 but the most interesting finds were discovered in 2005.

Crusader period
The Orthodox monastery of Mar Saba owned a farmstead in this area in the 12th century, during the existence of the Catholic Kingdom of Jerusalem established by Crusaders.

British Mandate period
During the British Mandate, the army built one of its radar stations in Bayit Vagan. A synagogue, Beit Knesset Migdal ("The Tower"), now stands on the spot.

Bayit Vagan was the third neighborhood built in West Jerusalem in modern times.

State of Israel
A scale-model of the Second Temple designed by Prof. Michael Avi-Yonah based on the writings of the Roman Jewish historian Josephus, was located for many years on the grounds of the Holyland Hotel in Bayit Vagan. In 2007, it was moved to the Israel Museum.

Schools and Jewish religious institutions

Many schools and Jewish religious institutions are located in Bayit Vagan, among them Ateret Yisrael Yeshiva, Kol Torah Yeshiva, Netivot Chochma Yeshiva, Yeshiva University's Gruss Kollel and Torat Tziyon program, Yeshivat Torat Shraga, Tiferet Yerushalayim, Michlalah Jerusalem College for Women, Seminar Yerushalayim HaChadash, Yad Harav Herzog, Himmelfarb High School, Boys Town Jerusalem, and Netiv Meir Yeshiva High School. The Amshinover Rebbe has his court in Bayit Vagan, on Rabbi Frank Street. The Boyar School, a secular high school for gifted students from all over the country, is also located in Bayit Vagan.

Medical facilities
Shaare Zedek Medical Center is located at the entrance to Bayit Vagan.

Sports facilities

The Beitar Jerusalem soccer club has a practice field in the neighborhood.
Below the soccer field it's 2 tunnels for the new 16 route.

Hotels and guesthouses
In recent years, a hotel by the name of Malon Hen (Hebrew: מלון חן lit. Hen Hotel) was built on the corner of Hapisga Street, and the Bayit Vagan youth hostel on the same street was upgraded to a guesthouse.

Notable residents 
Yehoshua Neuwirth, rabbi
Ezriel Auerbach, rabbi
Ahuvah Gray, Baptist minister from the US who converted to Judaism

References

External links

Views of Bayit Vagan

Neighbourhoods of Jerusalem
Orthodox Jewish communities in Jerusalem